Mount Thor (12,251 ft) is the second highest peak of the Chugach Mountains in Alaska. It is named after Thor, Norse God of Thunder, because of the noise of avalanches on this mountain.

Further reading 
 Colby Coombs, Michael Wood, Alaska: A Climbing Guide, PP 140-141
 USGS, Chugach Mountains

References

External links
 Mt. Thor: Flickr photo

Mountains of Matanuska-Susitna Borough, Alaska
Thor